Dismorphia hyposticta is a butterfly in the  family Pieridae. It is found in Ecuador, Venezuela, Colombia and Peru.

Subspecies
The following subspecies are recognised:
Dismorphia hyposticta hyposticta (Venezuela)
Dismorphia hyposticta manuelita Fassl, 1910 (Colombia)
Dismorphia hyposticta ophelia Lamas, 2004 (Peru)
Dismorphia hyposticta paulina Lamas, 2004 (Peru)

References

Dismorphiinae
Butterflies described in 1861
Pieridae of South America
Taxa named by Baron Cajetan von Felder
Taxa named by Rudolf Felder